Martin Anthony Scicluna (born 1950/1951) is a British businessman, and the chairman of Sainsbury's and RSA Insurance Group.

Scicluna was educated at Berkhamsted School and the University of Leeds.

Scicluna worked for Deloitte for 34 years, 26 years as a partner. He was chairman of Deloitte from 1995 to 2007.

References

Sainsbury's people
1950s births
British chairpersons of corporations
Deloitte people
Living people
Alumni of the University of Leeds
People educated at Berkhamsted School